Leeds West is a borough constituency in the city of Leeds, West Yorkshire which is represented in the House of Commons of the Parliament of the United Kingdom. It elects one Member of Parliament (MP) by the first-past-the-post system of election. The current MP is Rachel Reeves of the Labour Party. With the exception of the Parliament of 1983–87, the seat has been held by Labour since 1945.

Boundaries 

1885–1918: The Municipal Borough of Leeds wards of Armley and Wortley, Holbeck, and New Wortley, and part of Bramley ward.

1918–1950: The County Borough of Leeds wards of Armley and Wortley, and Bramley, and part of New Wortley ward.

1950–1955: The County Borough of Leeds wards of Bramley, Farnley and Wortley, and Upper Armley.

1955–1974: The County Borough of Leeds wards of Armley, Bramley, Stanningley, Wellington, and Wortley.

1974–1983: The County Borough wards of Armley and Castleton, Bramley, Stanningley, and Wortley.

1980–1983: The City of Leeds wards of Armley, Bramley, and Wortley.

1983–2010: The City of Leeds wards of Armley, Bramley, Kirkstall, and Wortley.

2010–present: The City of Leeds wards of Armley, Bramley and Stanningley, Farnley and Wortley, and Kirkstall.  Unusually for a Parliamentary seat, the boundaries do not correspond exactly to the wards' boundaries.  The seat includes small areas of the wards for Calverley and Farsley, and Morley North, but also excludes a very small area of Farnley and Wortley, which falls under Leeds Central.

The constituency covers the western part of the city of Leeds in West Yorkshire.

History
The constituency was created in 1885 by the Redistribution of Seats Act 1885, and was first used in the general election of that year.  Leeds had previously been represented by two MPs (1832–1868) and three MPs (1868–1885). From 1885 it was represented by five single-member constituencies: Leeds Central, Leeds East, Leeds North, Leeds South and Leeds West. The constituencies of Morley, Otley and Pudsey were also created in 1885.

Members of Parliament

Elections

Elections in the 2010s

Elections in the 2000s

Elections in the 1990s

Elections in the 1980s

Elections in the 1970s

Elections in the 1960s

Elections in the 1950s

Elections in the 1940s

Elections in the 1930s

Elections in the 1920s

Elections in the 1910s 

 * Chapman was supported by the three local branches of National Association of Discharged Sailors and Soldiers, National Federation of Discharged and Demobilized Sailors and Soldiers and Comrades of the Great War.

General Election 1914–15:

Another General Election was required to take place before the end of 1915. The political parties had been making preparations for an election to take place and by the July 1914, the following candidates had been selected; 
Liberal: Edmund Harvey
Unionist:

Elections in the 1900s

Elections in the 1890s 

Gladstone is appointed First Commissioner of Works, requiring a by-election.

Elections in the 1880s

See also 
 List of parliamentary constituencies in West Yorkshire

References 

Parliamentary constituencies in Yorkshire and the Humber
Constituencies of the Parliament of the United Kingdom established in 1885
Politics of Leeds